The Belgian Eerste Klasse (Dutch) or Division 1 (French) is the name of the professional handball league of Belgium.

Competition Format 

The season begins with a tournament between the six teams who don't participate at the BeNe League. The first two teams join the teams from the BeNe League and they are separated in two play-off groups while the four others teams from the opening tournament participate to the play-down.

2016/17 Season participants

The following 12 clubs compete in the Eerste Klasse during the 2016–17 season.

Eerste Klasse Champions

 1958 : Olympic Club Flémallois
 1959 : Olympic Club Flémallois (2)
 1960 : Olympic Club Flémallois (3)
 1961 : Olympic Club Flémallois (4)
 1962 : Olympic Club Flémallois (5)
 1963 : Olympic Club Flémallois (6)
 1964 : Olympic Club Flémallois (7)
 1965 : ROC Flémalle (8)
 1966 : CH Schaerbeek Brussels
 1967 : Progrès HC Seraing
 1968 : KV Sasja HC
 1969 : ROC Flémalle (9)
 1970 : ROC Flémalle (10)
 1971 : HC Inter Herstal
 1972 : SK Avanti Lebbeke
 1973 : SK Avanti Lebbeke (2)

 1974 : KV Sasja HC (2)
 1975 : KV Sasja HC (3)
 1976 : ROC Flémalle (11)
 1977 : Progrès HC Seraing (2)
 1978 : Sporting Neerpelt
 1979 : Yellow Red KV Mechelen
 1980 : Sporting Neerpelt (2)
 1981 : Sporting Neerpelt (3)
 1982 : Sporting Neerpelt (4)
 1983 : Sporting Neerpelt (5)
 1984 : Initia HC Hasselt
 1985 : Initia HC Hasselt (2)
 1986 : Initia HC Hasselt (3)
 1987 : Sporting Neerpelt (6)
 1988 : Sporting Neerpelt (7)
 1989 : Sporting Neerpelt (8)

 1990 : Sporting Neerpelt (9)
 1991 : Handball Club Herstal 
 1992 : Olse Merksem HC
 1993 : Initia HC Hasselt (4)
 1994 : Initia HC Hasselt (5)
 1995 : Initia HC Hasselt (6)
 1996 : Initia HC Hasselt (7)
 1997 : Initia HC Hasselt (8)
 1998 : Initia HC Hasselt (9)
 1999 : Initia HC Hasselt (10)
 2000 : Handball Club Eynatten
 2001 : Handball Club Eynatten (2)
 2002 : Handball Club Eynatten (3)
 2003 : HC Elckerlyc Tongeren
 2004 : Sporting Neerpelt (10)
 2005 : HC Elckerlyc Tongeren (2)

 2006 : KV Sasja HC (4)
 2007 : KV Sasja HC (5)
 2008 : KV Sasja HC (6)
 2009 : United HC Tongeren (3)
 2010 : United HC Tongeren (4)
 2011 : Initia HC Hasselt (11) 
 2012 : United HC Tongeren (5)
 2013 : Initia HC Hasselt (12) 
 2014 : Initia HC Hasselt (13) 
 2015 : United HC Tongeren (6)
 2016 : HC Achilles Bocholt
 2017 : HC Achilles Bocholt (2)
 2018 : HC Achilles Bocholt (3)

EHF coefficient ranking
For season 2017/2018, see footnote

19.  (27)  Extraliga (14.67)
20.  (19)  Extraliga (11.67)
21.  (24)  Eerste Klasse (11.25)
21.  (22)  SM-liiga (11.25)
23.  (32)  Lotto Eredivisie (10.78)

External links
 www.handball.be

References

Handball leagues in Belgium
Eerste Klasse
Belgium
Professional sports leagues in Belgium